2015–16 in Kuwaiti football includes several notable national tournaments held in Kuwait for the 2015-16 Football Season.

2015–16 Kuwaiti Premier League
2015–16 Kuwait Emir Cup
2015–16 Kuwait Crown Prince Cup
2015–16 Kuwait Federation Cup
Kuwait Super Cup

External links 
 
  
 Kuwait at the FIFA website.
 Kuwait at AFC site

 
Football in Kuwait